is a former Japanese football player.

Playing career
Yoshida was born in Nara Prefecture on August 4, 1982. After graduating from high school, he joined J2 League club Kyoto Purple Sanga in 2001. However he could not play at all in the match. In 2002, he moved to J2 club Ventforet Kofu. On March 3, he debuted as substitute defender against Yokohama FC in opening match in 2002 season. He played full time in next match against Avispa Fukuoka. However Ventforet lost both matches and he could not play at all in the match after that. In 2003, he moved to Prefectural Leagues club Sagawa Express Kyoto. In 2005, he moved to Japan Football League club Denso (later FC Kariya). He played many matches as regular player in 2 seasons. In 2007, he moved to Regional Leagues club Matsumoto Yamaga FC. Although he played many matches in 2007, he could hardly play in the match in 2008 and retired end of 2008 season.

Club statistics

References

External links

1982 births
Living people
Association football people from Nara Prefecture
Japanese footballers
J2 League players
Japan Football League players
Kyoto Sanga FC players
Ventforet Kofu players
MIO Biwako Shiga players
FC Kariya players
Matsumoto Yamaga FC players
Association football defenders